The Swan 57 is a sailboat and was designed by German Frers and built by Nautor's Swan and first launched in 1996. It was unlike most models not conceived as a cruiser/racer but a world cruising yacht the design features a raised saloon or centre cockpit.

References

Sailing yachts
Keelboats
1990s sailboat type designs
Sailboat types built by Nautor Swan
Sailboat type designs by Germán Frers